Patrick O'Boyle (2 December 1887 – 25 November 1971) was an Irish prelate who served as Bishop of Killala.

He was born in Ballina, County Mayo, in 1912. He went to St Jarlath's College, Tuam then St. Patrick's College, Maynooth. He was ordained priest on 18 June 1911. He taught at St Muredach's College, becoming Principal in 1920. O'Boyle was appointed Bishop of Killala on 12 December 1950, and received episcopal ordination  on 25 February 1951. He is buried at Ardnaree in his home town.

References

Roman Catholic bishops of Killala
20th-century Roman Catholic bishops in Ireland
Alumni of St Patrick's College, Maynooth
1887 births
1971 deaths
Religious leaders from County Mayo
People educated at St Jarlath's College